Distinguish from Rhys Goch ap Rhicert and Rhys Goch Glyndyfrdwy (fl. 1460)
Rhys Goch Eryri (or Rhys ab Dafydd) (fl. 1385 – 1448), was a 15th-century bard who lived at Hafod Garegog, near Beddgelert in North Wales. He was acquainted with Dafydd Nanmor, who lived in neighbouring Nantmor, and it is possible that Rhys Goch was a teacher to him. One of his poems urges a fox to kill Dafydd Nanmor's peacock. About 30 of his poems on various subjects are preserved.

He was reputed to be a friend and strong supporter of Owain Glyndŵr, though no poetry to him has survived.

George Borrow, in his book Wild Wales, reports that Festiniog was his birthplace :

According to tradition Rhys Goch spent his whole life in Eryri (Snowdonia), and was buried in Beddgelert churchyard.

External links
 A biography

Welsh-language poets
15th-century Welsh poets
People from Gwynedd